Graylog, Inc is a log management software company based in Houston, Texas. Their main product is a log management software which is also called Graylog (styled as graylog).

History
Graylog, formerly Torch, was founded in 2009 by Lennart Koopmann and began as an open-source project in Hamburg, Germany. The headquarters are in Houston, Texas.

In October 2014, Mercury made its initial investment in Graylog. e.ventures and Mercury Asset Management are later investors. The other investors were Crosslink Capital, Draper Associates and High-Tech Gründerfonds.

Graylog released its first commercial offering in 2016 making its enterprise product available. As of 2018, Graylog has grown to over 35,000 installations worldwide.

Graylog regularly participates in conferences such as DEF CON, DerbyCon, Black Hat USA, NolaCon, and Security BSides.

Graylog log management software
The Graylog software centrally captures, stores, and enables real-time search and log analysis against terabytes of machine data from any component in the IT infrastructure and applications. The software uses a three-tier architecture and scalable storage based on Elasticsearch and MongoDB.

See also
 Datadog
 Splunk
 Elasticsearch
 Sumo Logic
 Syslog-ng

References

Technology companies of the United States
Web log analysis software